The All Japan Federation of Automobile Transport Workers' Unions (Jikosoren) is a trade union representing transport workers in Japan.

The union was established in 1978, and by 1980 it had 32,369 members.  In 1989, it became affiliated with the new National Confederation of Trade Unions, and by 1990, its membership had grown to 37,465.  However, by 2019, it had only 12,068 members.

References

External links

Trade unions established in 1978
1978 establishments in Japan
Transport trade unions in Japan